Villa Hidalgo Municipality is a municipality in Zacatecas, Mexico.

References

Municipalities of Zacatecas